Emory Grove is a small area of bungalow style homes built in 1939 and the 1940s in Druid Hills, Georgia near Emory University.  The Emory Grove Historic District, located between Emory University and the city of Decatur, Georgia, is a  historic district that was listed on the National Register of Historic Places in 2000.

The district has 200 contributing buildings, 4 contributing sites and one other contributing structure. It includes work by architects and/or builders Ivey and Crook and Robert and Company in Colonial Revival and Late Gothic Revival architectural styles.

A significant date in its history is 1938.  It includes single dwellings, a school, a religious structure, and a church school, and it was listed for its architecture.

Emory Grove consists of Princeton Way, Westminster Way, and Edinburgh Terrace, and some houses along N. Decatur Road.

See also
Druid Hills Historic District
University Park-Emory Highlands-Emory Estates Historic District

References

External links
 Emory Grove Neighborhood Association at Stuart A. Rose Manuscript, Archives, and Rare Book Library, Emory University

Historic districts on the National Register of Historic Places in Georgia (U.S. state)
Colonial Revival architecture in Georgia (U.S. state)
Gothic Revival architecture in Georgia (U.S. state)
Geography of DeKalb County, Georgia
Decatur, Georgia
Houses on the National Register of Historic Places in Georgia (U.S. state)
Druid Hills, Georgia
Bungalow architecture in Georgia (U.S. state)
Houses in DeKalb County, Georgia
National Register of Historic Places in DeKalb County, Georgia